The 1991 Little League World Series took place between August 20 and August 24 in Williamsport, Pennsylvania. The Hsi Nan Little League of Taichung, Taiwan defeated the San Ramon Valley Little League of Danville, California in the championship game of the 45th Little League World Series.

Teams

Championship bracket

Position bracket

Notable players
Michael Cammarata (Staten Island, New York) – New York City Fire Department firefighter, died during the September 11 attacks
Ron DeSantis (Dunedin, Florida) – 46th Governor of Florida, former member of the United States House of Representatives
Lin Wei-chu (Taiwan) – Competed in the 2004 Summer Olympics and played for the Hanshin Tigers of Nippon Professional Baseball's Central League from 2003 to 2013
Jason Marquis (Staten Island, New York) – MLB pitcher from 2000 to 2015

References

External links

Little League World Series
Little League World Series
Little League World Series
Little League World Series